The 2025 IFAF World Championship is the upcoming sixth instance of the IFAF World Championship for American football. In December 2018, the IFAF announced that the games, which were originally scheduled to be held in Wollongong, Australia, from 29 July 2019 to 5 August 2019, would be postponed to 2023 citing the large number of withdrawals from top nations. In October 2022, the tournament was postponed until 2025.

Background

Bidding process 
On 13 July 2018, Australia was announced by IFAF as the host for the 2019 championship.

On 11 December 2021, IFAF announced that Germany would replace Australia as hosts of the rescheduled 2023 IFAF World Championship.

On 9 October 2022, IFAF announced that the tournament would be moved again, to 2025, entering talks with the German federation about hosting.

Qualification

References

External links 
 

IFAF World Championship